An Apollo Citharoedus, or Apollo Citharede, is a statue or other image of Apollo with a cithara (lyre). Among the best-known examples is the Apollo Citharoedus of the Vatican Museums, a 2nd-century AD colossal marble statue by an unknown (probably Roman) sculptor. Apollo is shown crowned with laurel and wearing the long, flowing robe of the Ionic bard. The statue was found in 1774, with seven statues of the Muses, in the ruins of Gaius Cassius Longinus' villa  near Tivoli, Italy. The sculptures are preserved in the Hall of the Muses, in the Museo Pio-Clementino of the Vatican Museums.

A marble sculpture now identified as Pothos following a lost Greek 4th-century BC original by Skopas was restored as an Apollo Citharoedus; it is conserved in the Great Hall of the Palazzo Nuovo, Capitoline Museums, Rome. Another marble Apollo Citharoedus (2.29m), from a Hellenistic original attributed to Timarchides, of the 2nd century BC,  also stands in the Great Hall of the Palazzo Nuovo.

Other examples include the Apollo of Mantua and the Apollo Barberini, possibly a copy of the cult statue of the Temple of Apollo Palatinus; it is conserved in the Glyptothek, Munich.

References

Citharoedus
2nd-century Roman sculptures
Musical instruments in art